Hussain Fadhel (born 9 October 1984 in Kuwait City, Kuwait) is a Kuwaiti footballer who currently plays for Qadsia SC and also Kuwait national football team.

He played for Al Qadisiya in the 2008 AFC Champions League group stages.

In August 2012, he went for trials to English club Nottingham Forest but failed to get a work permit.

He has made several appearances for the Kuwait national football team, including four qualifying matches for the 2010 FIFA World Cup.

On 9 January 2015, Fadhel scored the first goal of the 2015 AFC Asian Cup, scoring against host nation Australia in the 8th minute of the match, though his team ended up losing 4–1. Fadhel was also the first player to be booked in the 2015 Asian Cup, receiving a yellow card in the 19th minute of the match.

He won the UAE League Cup in 2016

International goals
Scores and results list Kuwait's goal tally first.

References

External links

1984 births
Living people
Kuwaiti footballers
Kuwait international footballers
Association football midfielders
Qadsia SC players
Al Wahda FC players
Kuwaiti expatriate footballers
Expatriate footballers in the United Arab Emirates
Kuwaiti expatriate sportspeople in the United Arab Emirates
2011 AFC Asian Cup players
2015 AFC Asian Cup players
Sportspeople from Kuwait City
Kuwait Premier League players
UAE Pro League players